Dionysus in '69 is a 1970 film by Brian De Palma, Robert Fiore and Bruce Rubin. The film records a performance of The Performance Group's stage play of the same name, an adaptation of The Bacchae. It was entered into the 20th Berlin International Film Festival.

Cast
 Remi Barclay as Chorus/Herself
 Samuel Blazer as Coryphaeus/Chorus/Himself
 Jason Bosseau as Messenger/Chorus/Himself
 Richard Dia as Cadmus/Chorus/Himself
 William Finley as Dionysus/Chorus/Himself
 Joan MacIntosh as Agave/Chorus/Herself
 Vicki May as Chorus/Herself
 Patrick McDermott as Tiresias/Chorus/Himself
 Margaret Ryan as Chorus/Herself
 Will Shepherd as Pentheus/Chorus/Himself
 Ciel Smith as Agave/Chorus/Herself

Production
The film merges the final two performances of the play, from June and July 1969, the final one having been staged with more lighting, for better recording quality. In contrast to the previous non-recorded performances, actors are not fully naked during central scenes so as to ensure distribution to movie theaters. The film makes use of split screen to show both actors and audience involvement in parallel.

See also
 List of American films of 1970

References

External links

Dionysus in '69 viewable online at the Hemispheric Institute Digital Video Library

1970 films
1970 drama films
American drama films
American black-and-white films
Films based on classical mythology
Films based on works by Euripides
Films directed by Brian De Palma
Works based on The Bacchae
1970s English-language films
1970s American films